Roman Najuch (15 February 1893 – 1967) was a professional tennis player and teacher based in Germany. He was born in a location of today's Poland belonging to the Russian Empire at that time. His family moved to Germany, caused by revolutions and wars, and settled in Berlin. One of his first teachers was Georg Kerr who left Germany in 1910. Later he got German citizenship. He took part in the first German Pro Championships 1911, still with Russian citizenship, and reached the final, but the winner was Karel Koželuh. He won the German Championships in 1913 and 1914. He was teaching at the LTTC Rot-Weiss Tennis Club in Berlin. In October 1925 he became German Champion for the seventh time. In 1928 and 1929 he won German Pro Championships. He was defeated in 1931 by his student Hans Nüsslein after getting the title for eleven times. With Hans Nüsslein, who was 17 years younger, he played in the doubles event. Najuch was the coach of Poland's Davis Cup team and became president of the International Pro Tennis Federation. His life career was presented on German TV in the series Wie ich angefangen habe (1957–1958). Marshall Jon Fisher called him "one of the world's best players at the time" around the year 1925.

References

External links 
 Ray Bowers: History 1929-1930
 Ray Bowers: History 1931
 Ray Bowers: Forgotten Victories, around 1934
 Obituary: Berliner Tennis-Blatt, Heft 1, Jahrgang 1968, page 16 (deutsch)

Professional tennis players before the Open Era
1893 births
1967 deaths
Polish male tennis players
Tennis players from Berlin
Emigrants from the Russian Empire to Germany